The 34th Great North Run took place on 7 September 2014 in Newcastle-upon-Tyne, England, United Kingdom with the men's and women's elite races and wheelchair races. After having been narrowly beaten by Kenenisa Bekele in 2013, Mo Farah was rooted to become the first Briton since Steve Kenyon in 1985 to win the men's race and the first in any elite race since Paula Radcliffe won the 2003 women's race. He broke the 29-year duck, helped by the absence of 2013 champion Bekele, and was only the third Briton to win the Men's Elite race.

Priscah Jeptoo, who won the 2013's women's title was also absent so Kenyan compatriot Mary Keitany won the women's marathon and broke the course record set by Radcliffe.

Britons David Weir and Shelly Woods were the defending wheelchair champions. Woods successfully defended the women's title while Spaniard Jordi Madeira became the newest men's champion. He is the first Spanish winner of the Great North Run.

The race crowned Tracey Cramond of Darlington its landmark millionth finisher. Tracey, who was running for Butterwick Hospice, was 37,396th in the race with a time of 03:02:03.

Results

Elite races
Elite Men

Elite Women

Wheelchair races
Wheelchair Men

Wheelchair Women

References

Half marathons in the United Kingdom
2014 in British sport
2014 in athletics (track and field)